Quercus acerifolia (also called maple-leaf oak) is a rare North American species of oak in the red oak section of Quercus (known as Lobatae). It is endemic to just four locations within the Ouachita Mountains of the State of Arkansas.

The tree sometimes reaches a height of 15 meters (50 feet). The venation of the leaves shows them to be technically pinnately five-lobed but with the two middle lobes larger than the other three. This makes the leaves appear palmately lobed at first glance, similar to many maple leaves. The epithet acerifolia means "maple-leaved."

The species is threatened by habitat loss throughout its fragmented range.

Groves of the tree are under cultivation in several locations, notably Stephens Lake Park Arboretum in Columbia, Missouri.

References

External links
photo of herbarium specimen at Missouri Botanical Garden, collected in Arkansas in 1924

acerifolia
Flora of Arkansas
Endemic flora of the United States
Trees of the United States
Plants described in 1927
Endangered flora of the United States
Taxonomy articles created by Polbot